The 1983 Air Canada Cup was Canada's fifth annual national midget 'AAA' hockey championship, which was played April 17 – 24, 1983 at the Laval University Sports and Physical Education Pavilion (PEPS) in Ste-Foy, Quebec.  The Regina Pat Canadians defeated the Gouverneurs de Ste-Foy to win the gold medal.  The Andrew Maroons, representing the Thunder Bay District, captured the bronze medal.  Tony Hrkac of the Andrews Maroons led the tournament in scoring, while Kirk McLean of the Don Mills Flyers was named the Top Goaltender. Other future National Hockey League players competing in this tournament were Alain Côté, Peter Douris, Brent Fedyk, Wade Flaherty, Ian Herbers, Dale Kushner, Scott Mellanby, and Don Sweeney.

Teams

Round robin

DC8 Flight

Standings

Scores

Don Mills 5 - Regina 1
Ste-Foy 7 - Winnipeg 2
Halifax 5 - Terrace 3
Regina 6 - Halifax 1
Don Mills 6 - Winnipeg 3
Ste-Foy 1 - Terrace 0
Winnipeg 4 - Regina 3
Don Mills 12 - Terrace 4
Ste-Foy 6 - Halifax 0
Don Mills 11 - Halifax 2
Winnipeg 2 - Terrace 1
Regina 4 - Ste-Foy 3
Halifax 4 - Winnipeg 3
Regina 8 - Terrace 4
Ste-Foy 8 - Don Mills 3

DC9 Flight

Standings

Scores

Ottawa West 6 - Saint John 4
Corner Brook 4 - Sherwood-Parkdale 1
Andrews 4 - Sherwood Park 3
Sherwood Park 9 - Corner Brook 1
Andrews 6 - Saint John 2
Sherwood-Parkdale 9 - Ottawa West 3
Andrews 6 - Corner Brook 2
Sherwood-Parkdale 6 - Saint John 2
Sherwood Park 6 - Ottawa West 4
Sherwood Park 5 - Saint John 1
Andrews 5 - Sherwood-Parkdale 1
Corner Brook 4 - Ottawa West 2
Andrews 6 - Ottawa West 3
Sherwood-Parkdale 3 - Sherwood Park 1
Corner Brook 7 - Saint John 4

Playoffs

Quarter-finals
Andrews 8 - Corner Brook 5
Regina 4 - Don Mills 3
Sherwood Park 8 - Sherwood-Parkdale 1
Ste-Foy 8 - Halifax 1

Semi-finals
Regina 6 - Andrews 2
Ste-Foy 5 - Sherwood Park 1

Bronze-medal game
Andrews 6 - Sherwood Park 1

Gold-medal game
Regina 5 - Ste-Foy 4

Individual awards
Most Valuable Player: Donnie Porter (Andrews)
Top Scorer: Tony Hrkac (Andrews)
Top Forward: Tim Iannone (Regina)
Top Defenceman: Selmar Odelein (Regina)
Top Goaltender: Kirk McLean (Don Mills)
Most Sportsmanlike Player: Rejean Boivin (Ste-Foy)

See also
Telus Cup

References

External links
Telus Cup Website
Hockey Canada-Telus Cup Guide and Record Book

Telus Cup
Air Canada Cup
Ice hockey in Quebec City
April 1983 sports events in Canada
1980s in Quebec City